Sânhuzen is a hamlet in the north of the Netherlands. It is located in Tytsjerksteradiel, Friesland.

Sânhuzen is not a statistical entity, and the postal authorities have placed it under Aldtsjerk. It has no place name signs and consists of about 15 houses.

References

Tytsjerksteradiel
Populated places in Friesland